Ermelindo Salazar Schuck (ca. 1830 – ca. 1910) was interim Mayor of Ponce, Puerto Rico, from May to 10 July 1887.  He filled the mayoral post between the resignation of mayor Ramón Elices Montes and the arrival of Fernando Diez de Ulzurrún y Somellera, who was appointed mayor by the Central Provincial Government.

Salazar Schuck was a merchant, landowner and banker, and is best remembered for his majestic residence in downtown Ponce (70 Cristina Street) and which today is home to the Carmen Solá de Pereira Ponce Cultural Center.  From 1959 to 1965, the building was the first home of the Museo de Arte de Ponce and from 1991 to 1996 it was the first headquarters of the Museo de la Música Puertorriqueña.

Early years
Ermelindo Salazar Schuck was born in Ponce, Puerto Rico, to Pedro Juan Salazar Fournier and Luisa Schuck.

Landowner, merchant and banker
Salazar Schuck was a prominent landowner, merchant, and banker from Ponce. In his life as a merchant, in 1885, he founded the Ponce Chamber of Commerce.
In the area of finance, Salazar became one of the directors, and later president, of Banco Crédito y Ahorro Ponceño, one of the largest and oldest in the Island.

Family life
Salazar Schuck married Leonora Fajardo, a wealthy woman also from Ponce. One of Ermelindo's sons, Guillermo Salazar, built his own majestic house also in the Ponce Historic Zone. This house was converted into the Museo de la Historia de Ponce in 1992.

Political and civic life
On 27 April 1884 he was elected as a delegate to the Cadiz Cortes. On 28 November 1917, Salazar y Schuck was appointed to the Board of Directors of the Port of Ponce. From two months (May to 10 July 1887), he filled the mayoral post between the resignation of mayor Ramón Elices Montes and the arrival of Fernando Diez de Ulzurrún y Somellera, who was appointed mayor by the Central Provincial Government.

Legacy
Salazar is honored at the Ponce Tricentennial Park for his contributions to the municipality of Ponce.<ref>[http://www.travelponce.com/Civism.html Civism.'] Travel Ponce. Retrieved 30 December 2011.</ref>

See also
List of mayors of Ponce, Puerto Rico
List of Puerto Ricans

References

Further reading
 Fay Fowlie de Flores. Ponce, Perla del Sur: Una Bibliográfica Anotada. Second Edition. 1997. Ponce, Puerto Rico: Universidad de Puerto Rico en Ponce. p. 109. Item 560. 
 The Representative Men of Puerto Rico. Compiled and edited by F.E. Jackson & Son. C. Frederiksen, artist and photographer. s.l.: F.E. Jackson & Son. 1901. (PUCPR; Universidad Puerto Rico - Rio Piedras, UPR).
 Fay Fowlie de Flores. Ponce, Perla del Sur: Una Bibliográfica Anotada. Second Edition. 1997. Ponce, Puerto Rico: Universidad de Puerto Rico en Ponce. p. 110. Item 566. 
 Guillermo Atiles Garcia. Kaleidoscopio. Ponce, Puerto Rico: Establecimiento tipográfico de Manuel López. 1905. (Colegio Universitario Tecnológico de Ponce, CUTPO)
 Fay Fowlie de Flores. Ponce, Perla del Sur: Una Bibliográfica Anotada. Second Edition. 1997. Ponce, Puerto Rico: Universidad de Puerto Rico en Ponce. p. 270. Item 1352. 
 Carmen Dolores Trelles. "Ponce: una casa para su historia." El Nuevo Dia.'' 5 Septiembre 1993. pp. 12-13. 

Mayors of Ponce, Puerto Rico
1830s births
1910s deaths

Year of birth uncertain
Year of death uncertain